Natalia Cristina Valentín León (born September 12, 1989) is a Puerto Rican volleyball player. She is a member and the current captain of the Puerto Rican national team.

Early life
Valentín was born in Río Piedras, Puerto Rico to Raúl Valentín and Norma León.

Clubs
  Leonas de Ponce (2014–2015)
  Azerrail Baku (2015–2016)
  Saint-Raphael Var Volley-Ball (2017-2019)
  Developres Skyres Rzeszow (2019-2020)
  Volley Bergamo 1991 (2020-2021)
  Athletes Unlimited (2022)

Awards

Individual
 2022 Athletes Unlimited "Best Setter"

Club
 2015–2016 Azerbaijan Super League –  Champion, with Azerrail Baku

References

1989 births
Living people
People from Río Piedras, Puerto Rico
Puerto Rican women's volleyball players
Volleyball players at the 2015 Pan American Games
Pan American Games competitors for Puerto Rico
Volleyball players at the 2016 Summer Olympics
Central American and Caribbean Games silver medalists for Puerto Rico
Competitors at the 2014 Central American and Caribbean Games
Setters (volleyball)
Summer Olympics competitors for Puerto Rico
Central American and Caribbean Games medalists in volleyball
21st-century Puerto Rican women